The caudal mucous pit, or caudal mucous horn, is an anatomical structure on the tail end of the foot of various land snails and slugs, terrestrial pulmonate gastropod mollusks.

The function of this pit is the resorption of mucus when the gastropod is moving (see also Muratov 1999).

An incorrect and yet often-used term for this structure is the "caudal gland".
This area also used to be referred to by the term "caudal pore".

Families
Families of snails and slug where a caudal mucous pit exists in every species included:
 Arionidae:
 Endodontidae
 Polygyridae
 Helicodiscidae
 Daudebardiinae (a subfamily of Oxychilidae)
 Urocyclidae
 Helicarionidae
 Ariophantidae
 Systrophiidae (Systrophiidae is a synonym for Scolodontinae, the subfamily of family Scolodontidae)
 Dyakiidae

Families/subfamilies where is caudal mucous pit exists only on some species included:
 Ariopeltinae (a subfamily of Oopeltidae)
 Charopidae
 Binneyidae
 Ariolimacinae (a subfamily of Ariolimacidae)
 Anadenidae
 Trochomorphidae
 Helminthoglyptidae
 Ferussaciidae
 Subulinidae
 Euconulidae
 Zonitidae
 Vitreinae (Vitreinae is a synonym for Pristilomatidae)
 Gastrodontidae

References

Further reading 
 Muratov I. V. (1999) "Analysis of the phylogenetic relationships and their systematic implications in the Limacoinei (=Zonitinia) infraorder (Gastropoda, Pulmonata, Geophila)". Ruthenica 9: 5-26.

External links 
 Photo of caudal mucous pit of Arion subfuscus

Gastropod anatomy